The discography of Del Amitri, a Scottish pop rock band formed in 1983, includes seven studio albums, one live album, three compilation albums and 24 singles. Five of their studio albums reached the top 10 in the UK Albums Chart. Their first album, which is a self-title album released in May 1985 did not enter the UK Albums Chart at all, and their final studio album Fatal Mistakes, released in May 2021, peaked at number 5. The band's most successful studio album was their third Change Everything, which reached second place in the UK Albums Chart. Also the band's compilation album, Hatful of Rain: The Best of Del Amitri, got to fifth place in the UK Albums Chart. The band broke up in 2002. They played a reunion gig at The Hydro Glasgow on 24 January 2014. A live album, Into the Mirror, recorded on the reunion tour in January and February 2014 was released on 20 October 2014.

The band reunited in 2020 and recorded their seventh studio album, Fatal Mistakes, which was released in May 2021.

Studio albums

Live albums

Compilation albums

Singles

References 

Discographies of British artists